Puya minima is a species in the genus Puya. This species is endemic to Bolivia.

References

minima
Flora of Bolivia